Buchanan County is located in the U.S. state of Missouri. As of the 2020 United States Census, the population was 84,793. Its county seat is St. Joseph. When originally formed in 1838, the county was named Roberts County, after settler Hiram Roberts. It was renamed in 1839 for James Buchanan, then a U.S. Senator and later President of the United States. The county was formed from land annexed to Missouri, as were five other counties.

Buchanan County is included in the Kansas City CSA.

Geography

Adjacent counties
Andrew County  (north)
DeKalb County  (northeast)
Clinton County  (east)
Platte County  (south)
Atchison County, Kansas  (southwest)
Doniphan County, Kansas  (northwest)

Major highways

 Interstate 29
 Interstate 229
 U.S. Route 36
 U.S. Route 59
 U.S. Route 71
 U.S. Route 169
 Route 6
 Route 31
 Route 116
 Route 371

Demographics

As of the census of 2000, there were 85,998 people, 33,557 households, and 21,912 families residing in the county.  The population density was 210 people per square mile (81/km2).  There were 36,574 housing units at an average density of 89 per square mile (34/km2).  The racial makeup of the county was 92.73% White, 4.36% Black or African American, 0.42% Native American, 0.45% Asian, 0.02% Pacific Islander, 0.65% from other races, and 1.37% from two or more races. Approximately 2.43% of the population were Hispanic or Latino of any race.

There were 33,557 households, out of which 30.60% had children under the age of 18 living with them, 49.30% were married couples living together, 12.00% had a female householder with no husband present, and 34.70% were non-families. 28.90% of all households were made up of individuals, and 12.50% had someone living alone who was 65 years of age or older.  The average household size was 2.42 and the average family size was 2.98.

In the county, the population was spread out, with 24.30% under the age of 18, 11.00% from 18 to 24, 28.50% from 25 to 44, 21.20% from 45 to 64, and 15.00% who were 65 years of age or older.  The median age was 36 years. For every 100 females, there were 96.70 males.  For every 100 females age 18 and over, there were 93.90 males.

The median income for a household in the county was $34,704, and the median income for a family was $42,408. Males had a median income of $31,697 versus $21,827 for females. The per capita income for the county was $17,882.  About 8.50% of families and 12.20% of the population were below the poverty line, including 15.00% of those under age 18 and 9.60% of those age 65 or over.

Religion
According to the Association of Religion Data Archives County Membership Report (2010), Buchanan County is sometimes regarded as being on the northern edge of the Bible Belt, with evangelical Protestantism being the most predominant religion. The most predominant denominations among residents in Buchanan County who adhere to a religion are Southern Baptists (24.96%), Roman Catholics (20.35%), and nondenominational evangelical groups (15.95%).

2020 Census

Education

Public schools
Buchanan County R-IV School District – De Kalb
Rushville Elementary School (PK-06) 
De Kalb Junior/Senior High School (07-12)
East Buchanan County C-I School District - Gower
East Buchanan County C-I Middle School (06-08) - Easton
Mid-Buchanan County R-V School District – Faucett
Mid-Buchanan County Elementary School (PK-06) 
Mid-Buchanan County High School (07-12)
St. Joseph School District – St. Joseph
Carden Park Elementary School (K-06) 
Coleman Elementary School (K-06) 
Edison Elementary School (PK-06) 
Ellison Elementary School (K-06) 
Field Elementary School (K-06) 
Hosea Elementary School (PK-06) 
Hyde Elementary School (K-06) 
Lindbergh Elementary School (PK-06) 
Mark Twain Elementary School (K-06) 
Oak Grove Elementary School (K-06) 
Parkway Elementary School (PK-06) 
Pershing Elementary School (K-06) 
Pickett Elementary School (PK-06) 
Skaith Elementary School (PK-06) 
Bode Middle School (07-08) 
Robidoux Middle School (07-08) 
Spring Garden Middle (07-08) 
Truman Middle School (07-08) 
Benton High School (09-12) 
Central High School (09-12) 
Lafayette High School (09-12)

Private schools
Baptist Temple Schools – St. Joseph (K-12) – Baptist
Cathedral School & Early Childhood Center – St. Joseph (NS/PK-08) – Roman Catholic
Prescott Seventh-day Adventist School – St. Joseph (02-08) – Seventh-day Adventist
St. Francis Xavier School – St. Joseph (K-09) – Roman Catholic
St. James School – St. Joseph (K-09) – Roman Catholic
St. Joseph Christian School – St. Joseph (PK-12) – Nondenominational Christian
St. Paul Lutheran School – St. Joseph (K-09) – Lutheran
St. Joseph KinderCare – St. Joseph (NS-PK)
South Park Christian Academy – St. Joseph (K-12) – Pentecostal
Bishop LeBlond High School – St. Joseph (9-12) – Roman Catholic

Public libraries
Rolling Hills Consolidated Library—Belt Branch  
Saint Joseph Public Library

Politics

Local
The Republican Party predominantly controls politics at the local level in Buchanan County. Republicans hold all but three of the elected positions in the county.

State

Buchanan County is split between three legislative districts in the Missouri House of Representatives, all of which are held by Republicans.

District 9 – Dean Van Schoiack (R-Savannah).  Consists of the eastern portion of the county.  

District 10 – Bill Falkner (R-St. Joseph). The district is entirely based in the city of St. Joseph. 

District 11 – Brenda Shields (R-St. Joseph). Consists of the southern part of the county.

All of Buchanan County is a part of Missouri's 34th District in the Missouri Senate and is currently represented by Tony Luetkemeyer (R-Parkville).

Federal
All of Buchanan County is included in Missouri's 6th Congressional District and is currently represented by Sam Graves (R-Tarkio) in the U.S. House of Representatives. Graves was elected to an eleventh term in 2020 over Democratic challenger Gena Ross.

Buchanan County, along with the rest of the state of Missouri, is represented in the U.S. Senate by Josh Hawley (R-Columbia) and Roy Blunt (R-Strafford).

Blunt was elected to a second term in 2016 over then-Missouri Secretary of State Jason Kander.

Political culture

At the presidential level, Buchanan County is a swing county that has become increasingly Republican in recent years. Buchanan County strongly favored Donald Trump in both 2016 and 2020. Barack Obama was the last Democratic presidential nominee to carry Buchanan County in 2008 with a plurality of the vote, but a Democrat hasn't won majority support from the county's voters in a presidential election since Michael Dukakis in 1988.

Missouri presidential preference primaries

2020
The 2020 presidential primaries for both the Democratic and Republican parties were held in Missouri on March 10. On the Democratic side, former Vice President Joe Biden (D-Delaware) both won statewide and carried Buchanan County by a wide margin. Biden went on to defeat President Donald Trump in the general election.

Incumbent President Donald Trump (R-Florida) faced a primary challenge from former Massachusetts Governor Bill Weld, but won both Buchanan County and statewide by overwhelming margins.

2016
The 2016 presidential primaries for both the Republican and Democratic parties were held in Missouri on March 15. Businessman Donald Trump (R-New York) narrowly won the state overall and carried a plurality in Buchanan County. He went on to win the presidency.

On the Democratic side, former Secretary of State Hillary Clinton (D-New York) narrowly won statewide, but Senator Bernie Sanders (I-Vermont) carried Buchanan County.

2012
The 2012 Missouri Republican Presidential Primary's results were nonbinding on the state's national convention delegates. Voters in Buchanan County supported former U.S. Senator Rick Santorum (R-Pennsylvania), who finished first in the state at large, but eventually lost the nomination to former Governor Mitt Romney (R-Massachusetts). Delegates to the congressional district and state conventions were chosen at a county caucus, which selected a delegation favoring Romney. Incumbent President Barack Obama easily won the Missouri Democratic Primary and renomination. He defeated Romney in the general election.

2008
In 2008, the Missouri Republican Presidential Primary was closely contested, with Senator John McCain (R-Arizona) prevailing and eventually winning the nomination. However, former Governor Mitt Romney (R-Massachusetts) narrowly carried Buchanan County.

Then-Senator Hillary Clinton (D-New York) received more votes than any candidate from either party in Buchanan County during the 2008 presidential primary. Despite initial reports that Clinton had won Missouri, Barack Obama (D-Illinois), also a Senator at the time, narrowly defeated her statewide and later became that year's Democratic nominee, going on to win the presidency.

Communities

Cities

Dearborn (partly in Platte County)
De Kalb
Easton
Gower (partly in Clinton County)
St. Joseph (county seat)

Villages

Agency
Lewis and Clark Village
Rushville

Unincorporated communities

 Faucett
 Frazier
 Garrettsburg
 Halleck
 Halls
 Lake Station
 San Antonio
 Saxton
 Sparta
 Wallace
 Willow Brook
 Winthrop

Townships
Buchanan County is divided into 12 townships:

 Agency
 Bloomington
 Center
 Crawford
 Jackson
 Lake
 Marion
 Platte
 Rush
 Tremont
 Washington
 Wayne

Notable people

Charles S. L. Baker, African American businessman and inventor
Kay Barnes, Mayor of Kansas City, Missouri (1999–2007)
Dwayne Blakley, professional football player
Ryan Bradley, figure skater
Norbert Brodine, cinematographer
Byron Browne, professional baseball player
Charles Francis Buddy, bishop, attended Christian Brothers School
Rob Calloway, boxer
Harold F. Cherniss, historian of ancient Greece and Plato scholar at Princeton
Walter Cronkite, iconic television journalist
Paul Crouch, founder of Trinity Broadcasting Network
Katherine Kennicott Davis, composer of "The Little Drummer Boy"
Eminem, rapper and recording artist
Eugene Field, popular poet in his day, worked for the St. Joseph Gazette and wrote a famous poem about Lover's Lane in St. Joseph
Ralph D. Foster, broadcasting pioneer
Betty Garrett, actress, known for On the Town and Laverne & Shirley
Elijah Gates, State Treasurer of Missouri (1877-1881)
Anthony Glise, guitarist
Jody Hamilton, wrestler
Larry Hamilton, wrestler
Fred Harman, artist, drew the Red Ryder cartoons and worked with Walt Disney
Coleman Hawkins, jazz saxophonist
Shere Hite, sex educator
Edie Huggins, television journalist
Bela M. Hughes, pioneer, prominent St. Joseph lawyer in 1850s and 1860s
 William Hyde (journalist), journalist
 Henry Iba, Oklahoma State University men's basketball coach
Jesse James, iconic outlaw, murdered in St. Joseph
Kagney Linn Karter, porn actress
Brian McDonald, writer 
Jeff Morris, actor, known for The Blues Brothers
Timothy Omundson, actor
Isaac Parker, federal judge, U.S. Representative from Missouri (1871-1875)
Travis Partridge, professional football player
Forrest E. Peden, decorated World War II soldier
Tom Pendergast, political boss
Seraphine Eppstein Pisko, executive secretary of the Denver Jewish Hospital
Frank Posegate, mayor of St. Joseph
LeRoy Prinz, choreographer and film director
Arthur Pryor, trombonist
Sid Rogell, Hollywood producer
Nellie Tayloe Ross, first woman elected governor of a U.S. state; Governor of Wyoming (1925–1927)
Martin Rucker, professional football player
Mike Rucker, professional football player
Jay Sarno, hotel mogul, founder of Caesars Palace
Bill Snyder, Kansas State football coach
Eddie Timanus, Jeopardy! champion, won five times in 1999 despite being blind
Steve Walsh, musician of band Kansas
Ruth Warrick, actress, known for Citizen Kane and All My Children
Jim Webb, U.S. Senator from Virginia (2007-2013)
Silas Woodson, 21st Governor of Missouri (1873-1875)
Huston Wyeth, industrialist
Jane Wyman, Oscar–winning actress and first wife of Ronald Reagan
Delmer J. Yoakum, artist
Olive Young, actress and blues singer

See also
 List of counties in Missouri
 National Register of Historic Places listings in Buchanan County, Missouri

References

External links
Buchanan County government's website
St. Joseph Missouri City Directories
St. Joseph Missouri Yearbook Indexes
 Digitized 1930 Plat Book of Buchanan County  from University of Missouri Division of Special Collections, Archives, and Rare Books

 
Missouri counties
St. Joseph, Missouri metropolitan area
1838 establishments in Missouri
Populated places established in 1838
Missouri counties on the Missouri River